Redlegs are the class of poor whites who lived on the colonial Barbados, St. Vincent, Grenada, and other Caribbean islands.

Redlegs may also refer to:

 The Cincinnati Reds baseball team from 1953 to 1958
 Members of the Field Artillery in the United States Army, from the red trouser stripe formerly part of the Artillery uniform 
 Unionist guerrillas who were headquartered at Lawrence, Kansas, during the American Civil War - see Jayhawker
 The Norwood Football Club, an Australian rules football club in the South Australian National Football League
 The Dandenong Football Netball Club, an Australian rules football club in the Southern Football Netball League
 The Perth Football Club, an Australian rules football club in the West Australian Football League
 Red Legs Greaves, a pirate who is noted for his humane treatment of prisoners
 The Redshank (Persicaria maculosa), a perennial plant from the Knotweed family
 Common name for Wood turtles, a North America turtle
 Common name for Bothriochloa macra, a grass species